Sərdarlı (also Sardarly) is a village in the Fuzuli District of Azerbaijan.

People
Fəridə Vəzirova, war hero and professor, was born here in 1924.

References 

Populated places in Fuzuli District